This is a list of the 26 multiple property submissions on the National Register of Historic Places in Alabama. They contain more than 288 individual listings of the more than 1,200 on the National Register in the state.

References

 
 Multiple Property Submissions
Alabama